BSD is the Berkeley Software Distribution, a free Unix-like operating system, and numerous variants.

BSD may also refer to:

Science and technology
 Bipolar spectrum disorder
 Birch and Swinnerton-Dyer conjecture, an important unsolved problem in mathematics
 Blind Spot Detection in vehicles

Computing
 BSD licenses, a family of permissive free software licenses originally from the Berkeley Software Distribution
 Bit stream decoder, a video decoder in a graphics processing unit

Organizations
 Birsa Seva Dal, a political group in India
 Bob- und Schlittenverband für Deutschland, the bobsleigh, luge, and skeleton federation for Germany
 Blue State Digital, a new media strategy and technology firm
 Cray Business Systems Division, or Cray BSD

Schools
 Beaverton School District, a school district in Beaverton, Oregon, US
 Bellevue School District, the school district of Bellevue, Washington, US
 Benoit School District, the school district of Benoit, Mississippi, US
 Brandywine School District, a school district in New Castle County, Delaware, US
 Burlingame School District, a school district in Burlingame, California, US

Sports
 Bally Sports Detroit, American regional sports network owned and operated by Bally Sports

Places
 Bumi Serpong Damai, a planned city in Greater Jakarta, Indonesia
 Baoshan Yunduan Airport (IATA code), China

Other uses
 BSD Records, a 1950s record label
 Black Spiral Dancer, a Tribe of evil-aligned werewolves in the White Wolf produced role-playing game Werewolf: The Apocalypse
 Besiyata Dishmaya, BS"D, an Aramaic phrase meaning "with the help of Heaven"
 Bahamian dollar, ISO 4217 code BSD
 Bungo Stray Dogs, a Japanese manga and anime series.

See also
 Berkeley Software Design (BSDi), a former corporation which developed, sold and supported BSD/OS
 BSD/OS, originally called BSD/386 and sometimes known as BSDi, a proprietary version of the BSD operating system developed by Berkeley Software Design
 List of BSD operating systems
 Blue Screen of Death (BSoD), an error screen displayed after a fatal system error
 Bipolar Spectrum Diagnostic Scale (BSDS)